Fabiola Piroddi (born 23 May 1969) is an Italian former sprinter. She competed in the women's 4 × 400 metres relay at the 2000 Summer Olympics.

References

External links
 

1969 births
Living people
Athletes (track and field) at the 2000 Summer Olympics
Italian female sprinters
Olympic athletes of Italy
Mediterranean Games silver medalists for Italy
Mediterranean Games medalists in athletics
Sportspeople from Cagliari
Athletes (track and field) at the 2001 Mediterranean Games
Olympic female sprinters
Sardinian women